The Proclamation of Independence of the Democratic Republic of Vietnam was written by Hồ Chí Minh, and announced in public at the Ba Đình flower garden (now the Ba Đình Square) in Hanoi on September 2, 1945. It led to the foundation of the Democratic Republic of Vietnam, replacing the Nguyen dynasty.

History

Vietnam, under the Nguyen dynasty, became a protectorate of France in the late 19th century, but during World War II, Japan occupied the country from 1940. During this period the Viet Minh fought a guerrilla war against the Japanese and were to a degree supported by the Americans in 1945 via the Office of Strategic Services.

On August 22, 1945, the OSS agent Archimedes Patti, who had met Ho Chi Minh in southern China, arrived in Hanoi on a mercy mission to liberate allied POWs and was accompanied by Jean Sainteny a French government official. The Japanese forces informally surrendered (the official surrender took place on September 2, 1945 in Tokyo Bay) but were the only force capable of maintaining law and order the Imperial Japanese Army and so remained in power and kept French colonial troops detained.

Japanese forces allowed the Việt Minh and other nationalist groups to take over public buildings and weapons without resistance, which began the August Revolution. On the morning of August 26, 1945, at No. 48 Hàng Ngang, Hà Nội, Chairman Hồ Chí Minh presided over the meeting of the Central Standing Communist Party of Vietnam, which he had called. The meeting unanimously decided to prepare to proclaim independence and to organize a large meeting in Hà Nội for the Provisional Government to present itself to the people. That was also the day that Vietnam officially promulgated the right of freedom and established a democratic republic system.

On August 30, 1945, Hồ Chí Minh invited several people to contribute their ideas toward his Proclamation of Independence, including a number of American OSS officers. OSS officers met repeatedly with him and other Viet Minh officers during late August, and Archimedes Patti claimed to have listened to Ho read to him a draft of the Proclamation, which he believed sounded very similar to the American Declaration of Independence.

On September 2, 1945, Hồ Chí Minh read the Proclamation during a public meeting in front of thousands of people at what is now Ba Đình Square and announced the birth of the Democratic Republic of Vietnam and the country's independence and becoming a republic.

Original

References

External links
Recording of original proclamation (Vietnamese) and full text (English) – Government of the Socialist Republic of Vietnam

Declarations of independence of Vietnam
Vietnamese independence movement
1945 in Vietnam
1945 in French Indochina
1945 in international relations
1945 in law
Aftermath of World War II in Vietnam
Ho Chi Minh
Proclamations
1945 in the French colonial empire
September 1945 events in Asia
1945 documents